Martin Newell (born 4 March 1953) is an English singer–songwriter, poet, columnist and author who leads the Cleaners from Venus, a guitar pop band with jangly, upbeat arrangements. He is also regarded as a significant figure in the history of cassette culture and DIY music.

Musical career

1973–1979
In the summer of 1973, a 20-year-old Newell joined Colchester glam rock cover band Plod as their lead singer, replacing founder member Steve Greenfield. Plod was signed to London-based indie label Banjul Records in early 1975, and quickly began recording tracks for an album. However, contractual irregularities and financial problems at the label prevented the album from being finished or released, and the band broke up within a few months of being signed. In 2003, one track from the sessions ("Neo City") was released on a 70s glam-rock compilation CD titled Velvet Tinmine. This track was credited to The Plod, and remains the only officially issued work by the band.

Newell then joined Gypp, a pop-oriented progressive rock band, as lead singer. Gypp also played abroad and became popular in Germany's North Rhine-Westphalia area thanks to their live performances. Gypp issued one 3-song 7-inch EP in 1978, but their music was out of step with the punk-oriented trends of the UK music scene at the time and the EP received a negative review in the New Musical Express.  Demoralised, Newell left the band. By his own account, he then became a "musical recluse", staying in the studio and creating new songs but not playing live gigs for many years.

1979–1992
In the late seventies, Newell led a four-piece rock combo called The Stray Trolleys. They recorded material in 1979 and 1980, but it was not released until after the band had broken up.

In the meantime, Newell issued his first solo single ("Young Jobless" b/w "Sylvie in Toytown") on vinyl in 1980. By the end of 1980, he was collaborating with Lawrence "Lol" Elliot as The Cleaners from Venus, a band that mostly released their work on cassettes outside the traditional music distribution channels.

By 1983, The Cleaners from Venus had evolved into a band with a floating line-up that featured Newell as its only constant. The band still primarily issued material on cassette, got signed to the West German independent label Modell Records for one vinyl album (Under Wartime Conditions) and ultimately to the German subsidiary of RCA Records which released two albums (Going to England, Town and Country).

Giles Smith joined Newell as the only other official member of Cleaners from Venus between 1986 and 1988, and in 1987, Newell returned to performing live under The Cleaners of Venus banner. As well, while regularly releasing Cleaners from Venus material on cassette, through the 1980s Newell also occasionally released cassette singles and albums under his own name. On these solo releases he was usually the only musician.

In spring 1988 Newell and Nelson (Peter Nice) formed the duo The Brotherhood of Lizards, self-releasing the mini-album The Brotherhood of Lizards that same year, followed by the album Lizardland released on independent label Deltic Records in 1989. To support Lizardland the duo embarked on an eco-friendly promotional tour, cycling over 1000 miles across southern England between October 1989 and February 1990 to make local radio appearances and do local newspaper interviews, while also busking and performing gigs. The uniqueness of this "green tour" caught the attention of the mainstream media with the duo making half a dozen television appearances, and interviews with them appeared in the NME, Melody Maker, The Guardian, The Independent, The Mail on Sunday and Time Out. On completion of the tour Nelson was recruited as the replacement bass player for the band New Model Army and the Brotherhood of Lizards disbanded.

1993–present
In 1993, Newell began working primarily as a solo artist with more conventional production values. His first non-cassette solo album, The Greatest Living Englishman, was produced by XTC's Andy Partridge, and was a critical success. Commercially, it remains his most popular and successful album.  It was followed by three more albums (The Off White Album, produced by Louis Philippe, The Spirit Cage and Radio Autumn Attic) and an EP (Songs from the Station Hotel) that continued to explore the same subject matter as Englishman, including the charms of rural or small-town English life and portraits of characters and scenes.

Newell has also made live appearances with The Cleaners from Venus and The Stray Trolleys in the 1990s and beyond, and has issued several post-1993 live recordings with these bands. However, studio releases credited to these groups post-1993 are actually all CD reissues of pre-1993 material previously released only on cassette. In addition, Gypp played reunion gigs in 1996, and live Gypp material – as well as Gypp demos recorded in the late 1970s – have now been officially issued on CD.

In 2004 Newell released an album of light jazz songs, The Light Programme. The album was not particularly successful commercially but his next album A Summer Tamarind returned to his usual style and was much more warmly received.

In late 2005 the British singer Richard Shelton released a jazz vocal album called Top Cat with five Newell compositions. Newell's songs have also been recorded by Miki Huber, The Jennifers, Kerry Getz, R. Stevie Moore and Alphaville. In 2011 MGMT covered a Cleaners From Venus song on their We Hear of Love, of Youth, and of Disillusionment EP.

Since 2010, Newell has returned to making lo-fi, self-released music under the name Cleaners from Venus.

Filmography
Newell is the subject of Graham Bendel's 2019 documentary Upstairs Planet: Cleaners from Venus & the Universe of Martin Newell, the 2022 documentary The Jangling Man: The Martin Newell Story and the 2022 animated documentary short A Man for Our Time.

Literary career
Newell is better known to some as a poet and author; he has released several volumes of poetry (often in collaboration with the illustrator James Dodds) and a memoir, This Little Ziggy, about his youth and his days in Plod. In 2007 he released a volume of reminiscences, anecdotes and historical information about his beloved Wivenhoe. He is also a weekly contributor of poetry to The Sunday Express, He now writes a weekly column for the East Anglian Daily Times (for which he won columnist of the year in the EDF/ East of England Media Awards in January 2010), performs annually at the Essex Book Festival and occasionally issues spoken word recordings of his poems.

Personal life
Newell has dyspraxia and Asperger syndrome.

Discography

Writing

Books 
I Hank Marvinned... ("Martin Newell, c/o The Essex Festival, Department of Literature, University of Essex"; no publisher stated, 1991.  no ISBN.) 16-page booklet of poems. .
Under Milk Float. Colchester: The Greyhound Press, 1992. Illustrated by Barry Woodcock. . 60-page book of poems
The Illegible Bachelor. Colchester: Festival Books, 1996. . Poems
Poetic Licence: The Best of 1990–1996. Ipswich: Jardine Press, 1996. . Poems
Wild Man of Wivenhoe. [Wivenhoe:] Jardine Press, 1996. Illustrated by James Dodds.  Long poem
New Top Poetry. Off Licence Books, 1999. . Poems
Black Shuck: The Ghost Dog of Eastern England. Hadleigh: Jardine Press, 1999. Illustrated by James Dodds. . Long poem
Late Autumn Sunlight: East Anglian Verses. [Wivenhoe:] Jardine Press, 2001. Illustrated by James Dodds. . 
2nd edition. [Wivenhoe:] Jardine Press, 2007. .
This Little Ziggy. House of Stratus, 2001. . Memoir
2nd edition. Wiven Books, 2008. .
The Song of the Waterlily: The Building of a Boat. Jardine Press, 2003. Illustrated by James Dodds.  . Long poem
Return to Flanders. Jardine Press, 2004. Illustrated by Andrew Dodds. . Long poem.
Spoke 'n' Word. Jardine Press, 2006. Illustrated by Charlotte Bernays. . 19 poems about Essex. Supposedly inspired by bicycle rides in the county.
A Prospect of Wivenhoe. Snapshots of an English Town. Wiven Books 2007. .
Selected Poems  – A Career Best Of. Jardine Press 2008. 
Horses Seen Through Trees. Wivenhoe: Wivenhoe Bookshop, 2010. . Illustrated by Charlotte Bernays, foreword by Andrew Phillips.
The Green Children. Jardine Press, 2015. 
Wife of '55. Bungay, Suffolk: Nasty Little Press, 2015. . Poems
The Greatest Living Englishman. Autumn Girl, 2019. . Memoir

Contributions 
Pioneer: Last of the Skillingers (One poem, "The Ballad of the Pioneer".) 2002.  Revised and enlarged ed. Jardine Press, 2004. 
Shipshape 2001.  (hardback)  (paperback)
Est: Collected Reports from East Anglia. Dunlin Press, 2015. .

References

External links

Martin Newell interviewed about reissue of the first 3 records by The Cleaners from Venus as well as his current life in Rocker Magazine 2012
Martin Newell a poem by John Cooper Clarke
 edited by Paul Wilkinson, with news, poems, mp3 files, etc.
The Mighty Plod

1953 births
Living people
English rock musicians
English male singers
English pop guitarists
English male guitarists
English songwriters
Jangle pop groups
English male poets
20th-century English poets
21st-century English poets
21st-century English male writers
20th-century English male writers
Cherry Red Records artists
RCA Records artists
Liberty Records artists
Captured Tracks artists
People with Asperger syndrome
Cassette culture 1970s–1990s